Chordariaceae is a family of brown algae. Members of this family are may be filamentous, crustose with fused cells at the base, or they may be terete and differentiated into a central medulla and an outer photosynthetic cortex.  They have a sporphytic thallus usually aggregated to form a pseudo-parenchyma.

As their general name suggests their pigmentation is brown.

Genera include:

References

 
Brown algae families